Guerra was an Italian professional cycling team that existed from 1949 to 1954. Whilst with Guerra, Hugo Koblet won the general classification of the 1950 Giro d'Italia.

References

External links

Cycling teams based in Italy
Defunct cycling teams based in Italy
1949 establishments in Italy
1954 disestablishments in Italy
Cycling teams established in 1949
Cycling teams disestablished in 1954